Darryn “Big Diesel” Schonig (born 20 March 1996) is an Australian professional rugby league footballer who plays as a  for the Canterbury-Bankstown Bulldogs, contracted to their feeder side Clydesdales based in Toowoomba, Queensland. 

He previously played for the Melbourne Storm in the NRL.

Background
Born in Cooktown, Queensland, Schonig played his junior rugby league for the Edmonton Storm and attended Kirwan State High School, where he represented the 2014 Australian Schoolboys, before being signed by the Sydney Roosters.

Playing career
In 2012, Schonig played for the Northern Pride in the Cyril Connell Cup. In 2014, he played for the Sydney Roosters in the SG Ball Cup, coming off the bench in their Grand Final win over the Penrith Panthers. 

In 2015, Schonig was released by the Roosters and returned to Cairns, playing for Cairns Brothers in the Cairns District Rugby League A-Grade. In 2016, he joined the North Queensland Cowboys playing 26 games for their under-20 side. In July 2016, he started at prop for the Queensland under-20 team.

In 2017, Schonig joined the Northern Pride, spending two seasons with the club. In 2019, he moved to Melbourne Storm feeder club, the Sunshine Coast Falcons, and earned an NRL contract with the club.

Melbourne Storm
In round 9 of the 2020 NRL season, Schonig made his NRL debut for the Melbourne Storm against the Canberra Raiders.

Schonig played just one game during the 2021 NRL season with a knee injury keeping him on the sidelines. He was released by Melbourne at the end of the 2021 season, rejoining the Sunshine Coast Falcons in 2022.

References

External links
Melbourne Storm profile 
QRL profile

1996 births
Living people
Australian rugby league players
Melbourne Storm players
Northern Pride RLFC players
Rugby league props
Rugby league players from Queensland
Sunshine Coast Falcons players